Statue of Christopher Columbus may refer to:

 Statue of Christopher Columbus (Astoria, Queens), New York City, U.S.
 Statue of Christopher Columbus (Atlantic City, New Jersey), U.S.
 Statue of Christopher Columbus (Baltimore), Maryland, U.S.
 Statue of Christopher Columbus (Baton Rouge, Louisiana), U.S.
 Statue of Christopher Columbus (Beacon Hill, Boston), Massachusetts, U.S.
 Statue of Christopher Columbus (Bridgeport, Connecticut), U.S.
 Statue of Christopher Columbus (Brooklyn), New York City, U.S.
 Statue of Christopher Columbus (Buffalo, New York), U.S.
 Statue of Christopher Columbus (Camden, New Jersey), U.S.
 Statue of Christopher Columbus (Central Park), New York City, U.S.
 Statue of Christopher Columbus (Chelsea, Massachusetts), U.S.
 Statue of Christopher Columbus (Chicago), Illinois, U.S.
 Statue of Christopher Columbus (Chula Vista, California), U.S.
 Statue of Christopher Columbus (Columbia, South Carolina), U.S.
 Statue of Christopher Columbus (Columbus City Hall), Columbus, Ohio, U.S.
 Statue of Christopher Columbus (Columbus State Community College), Columbus, Ohio, U.S.
 Statue of Christopher Columbus (Columbus, Wisconsin), U.S.
 Statue of Christopher Columbus (Denver), Colorado, U.S.
 Statue of Christopher Columbus, Guadalajara, Jalisco, Mexico
 Statue of Christopher Columbus (Hartford, Connecticut), U.S.
 Statue of Christopher Columbus (Houston), Texas, U.S.
 Statue of Christopher Columbus (Lima), Peru
 Statue of Christopher Columbus (Miami), Florida, U.S.
 Statue of Christopher Columbus (Middletown, Connecticut), U.S.
 Statue of Christopher Columbus (Newark, New Jersey), U.S.
 Statue of Christopher Columbus (Newburgh, New York), U.S.
 Statue of Christopher Columbus (New Haven, Connecticut), U.S.
 Statue of Christopher Columbus (New London, Connecticut), U.S.
 Statue of Christopher Columbus (Newport, Rhode Island), U.S.
 Statue of Christopher Columbus (North End, Boston), Massachusetts, U.S.
 Statue of Christopher Columbus (Norwalk, Connecticut), U.S.
 Statue of Christopher Columbus (Ohio Statehouse), Columbus, Ohio, U.S.
 Statue of Christopher Columbus (Philadelphia), Pennsylvania, U.S.
 Statue of Christopher Columbus (Pittsburgh), Pennsylvania, U.S.
 Statue of Christopher Columbus (Providence, Rhode Island), U.S.
 Statue of Christopher Columbus (Richmond, Virginia), U.S.
 Statue of Christopher Columbus (Saint Paul, Minnesota), U.S.
 Statue of Christopher Columbus (San Antonio), Texas, U.S.
 Statue of Christopher Columbus (San Francisco), California, U.S.
 Statue of Christopher Columbus (St. Louis), Missouri, U.S.
 Statue of Christopher Columbus (Trenton, New Jersey), U.S.
 Statue of Christopher Columbus (Waterbury, Connecticut), U.S.
 Statue of Christopher Columbus (Wilkes-Barre, Pennsylvania), U.S.
 Statue of Christopher Columbus (Wilmington, Delaware), U.S.
 Statue of Christopher Columbus (Yonkers, New York), U.S.

See also
 Bust of Christopher Columbus (disambiguation)
 Columbus Fountain
 Columbus Monument (disambiguation)
 List of monuments and memorials to Christopher Columbus
 Monument to Christopher Columbus (disambiguation)